Elder Dempster Lines was a UK shipping company that traded from 1932 to 2000, but had its origins in the mid-19th century.

Founders

Alexander Elder
Alexander Elder was born in Glasgow in 1834. He was the son of David Elder, who for many years was manager of Robert Napier and Sons, the engine and shipbuilders and the brother of John Elder.

Alexander Elder was chief engineer of Columbian, a  iron-hulled barque with a 2,116 ihp engine. She was built for the Australian run, and was chartered by France in 1855 as a troop ship for the Crimean War.

In 1856 Alexander Elder joined W and H Laird as superintendent engineer for the African Steamship Company.

John Dempster
John Dempster was born in 1837 in Penport, Thornhill, Dumfriesshire where his father, William Dempster, was builder to the Duke of Buccleuch. The Dempster family moved to Birkenhead in the 1840s and John joined W and H Laird as a clerk in 1851 when he was aged 14.

History

Elder Dempster and Company

Elder Dempster and Company began its commercial activities on 1 October 1868, when John Dempster made it his business to circularise all potential customers:
"I beg to inform you that this Company intend to dispatch, early in January next, the first of their line of Steamers, at present being constructed on the Clyde for trading between Glasgow, Liverpool and the West Coast of Africa.
"The Steamers are to sail monthly, and the ports which it is intended shall be called at are Sierra Leone, Cape Palmas, Cape Coast Castle, Accra, Lagos, Benin Bonny, Old Calabar and Fernando Po, but should sufficient inducement offer, arrangements will be made for their calling at other ports, either on the outward or homeward voyages. The Steamers are being specially built for the African Trade and, besides being comfortably fitted up for passengers, they will have extensive cargo space, which will enable them to carry rough goods at moderate rates."

Elder Dempster Shipping Limited
Elder Dempster Shipping Limited was formed in 1899. Among their ships were the liner SS Monterey and the steamer SS Montezuma, which in early 1900 were both chartered as transport ships for British troops destined for South Africa during the Second Boer War.

In 1900 they established a direct steamship service between the United Kingdom and the West Indies.

Elder Dempster Lines
In 1932 Elder Dempster Shipping Ltd, together with the African Steamship Company, and the British & African Steam Navigation Company, came under the Elder Dempster Lines name.

The company operated from British ports, mainly Liverpool, where it was based, to West African destinations. It ran numerous cargo ships and a small number of passenger liners. Before the Second World War its passengers liners were Accra and Apapa, built in 1926 and 1927, plus its flagship  which was launched in 1935. In the Second World War the company lost a number of ships to enemy action, including both Accra and Apapa in 1940 and Abosso in 1942. However, during the war its passenger services continued to run between Liverpool and West Africa, escorted by British submarines. Among its passengers were students from British colonies such as the Gold Coast and Nigeria awarded imperial scholarships to study at Oxford and Cambridge universities, such as the Gold Coast student PK Owusu, on his way to study English literature at Queens College, Cambridge in 1944.

After the war a new Accra and Apapa were launched in 1947 and 1948, followed by a new flagship,  in 1951, for the company's services to Ghana and Nigeria.

The company expanded, taking over a number of other shipping companies between 1951 and 1965, one of which was British & Burmese Steam Navigation Co Ltd which was purchased in 1952. The chartered ships were retained on the West Africa routes while P. Henderson & Co. continued to manage the Burma traders. In 1967 the six day war closed the Suez Canal causing Henderson's service to Burma ceased and their last three ships transferred to Elder Dempster routes.

When the Nigerian National Shipping Line was formed in 1957, Elder Dempster took a 33 percent stake, selling in 1961 to the Nigerian government.

Ocean Fleets
In 1965 the company came under the ownership of the Ocean Steamship Company (Blue Funnel Line).

By 1970 all stock in the former Shaw, Savill & Albion Line had been transferred to Elder Dempster.

Delmas-Vieljeux
The end for the Elder Dempster Lines name came in 1989 when it was bought by the French firm Delmas-Vieljeux, although the company continued as a shipping agents until 2000 when it was wound up.

Non-shipping interests
At the end of the 19th century the company had been instrumental in forming the Bank of British West Africa (renamed the Bank of West Africa in the 1950s, and subsequently acquired by the Standard Bank).

From 1935 to 1940 the company jointly operated Elders Colonial Airways based in Nigeria, together with Imperial Airways, for passengers within West Africa. The onset of WWII saw the end of this joint venture. At the height of its power it controlled the lands from Ijora-Olopa to Apapa in Nigeria's Lagos port area, the Nigerian Ports Authority grew out of the structure created by Elder Dempster.

British Railways Merchant Navy Class steam locomotive 35030 was named Elder-Dempster Line after the company.

Involvement in the Belgian Congo
In the late 19th century Dempster held a shipping contract with King Leopold II to ship goods and supplies to and from the Congo Free State. E. D. Morel, the main activist in the movement to expose the abuses of Leopold in his private colony, first realized the discrepancy in value trade goods being sent to the Congo while working for Dempster. As much as 80 percent of the goods being shipped to the Congo on Dempster ships were ammunition and other weapons. From this shipping information Morel deduced the extremely aggressive tactics being used by Leopold.

Notable litigation
Elder Dempster have been party to numerous cases which have later become a significant part of English common law precedent, particularly in contract law and maritime law. Such cases include Elder Dempster v. Paterson, Zochonis, Elder Dempster v Dunn & Co, Elder Dempster Lines v Zaki Ishag, and Rudd v Elder Dempster.

Legacy
The Elder Museum of Science and Technology on Gran Canaria in the Canary Islands takes its name from a building once owned by Elder Dempster Lines.

References

Bibliography

External links
 
 

Transport companies established in 1868
Transport companies disestablished in 2000
Defunct companies based in Liverpool
Defunct shipping companies of the United Kingdom
1868 establishments in England
2000 disestablishments in England